Eagle Valley High School (EVHS) is a four-year public high school located in Gypsum, Colorado.

Academics 
Both advanced placement and dual-enrollment courses are available at the school. Four adjunct Colorado Mountain College educators teach there.

$11,834 is spent per student.

The student-to-teacher ratio is 17.7.

Enrollment 
EVHS has 950 students enrolled. Of those, approximately 51% are Hispanic, 46% are Caucasian, and 3% are classified as "other." 52% identify as male, 48% identify as female. 28% of students are classified as economically disadvantaged. 23% are in the free lunch program. 6% are in the reduced-price lunch program.

Faculty 
EVHS has approximately 95 staff members: sixty-two teachers, four Colorado Mountain College adjunct faculty, four counselors, and four administrators.

Ratings 
U.S. News ranks EVHS 4,644th nationally, 119th on the state scale, and third in the Eagle County School District.

References 

Schools in Eagle County, Colorado
Public high schools in Colorado